The C. F. Hansen Medal (Danish: C. F. Hansens Medaille) is awarded annually with few exceptions to one or more recipients by the Royal Danish Academy of Fine Arts for an outstanding contribution to architecture. It is the Academy's highest obtainable distinction for an architect. It is named after the architect C. F. Hansen and has been awarded since 1830.

Recipients

See also 
 Eckersberg Medal
 Thorvaldsen Medal
 List of European art awards

References

External links 
 Full listing of C.F. Hansen Medal winners from Akademiraadet

1830 establishments in Denmark
Architecture awards of Denmark
Awards established in 1830
Danish art awards
Royal Danish Academy of Fine Arts